The canton of Le Nord-Libournais is an administrative division of the Gironde department, southwestern France. It was created at the French canton reorganisation which came into effect in March 2015. Its seat is in Coutras.

It consists of the following communes:
 
Abzac
Les Artigues-de-Lussac
Bayas
Bonzac
Camps-sur-l'Isle
Chamadelle
Coutras
Les Églisottes-et-Chalaures
Le Fieu
Francs
Gours
Guîtres
Lagorce
Lapouyade
Lussac
Maransin
Montagne
Néac
Les Peintures
Petit-Palais-et-Cornemps
Porchères
Puisseguin
Puynormand
Sablons
Saint-Antoine-sur-l'Isle
Saint-Christophe-de-Double
Saint-Christophe-des-Bardes
Saint-Cibard
Saint-Ciers-d'Abzac
Saint-Denis-de-Pile
Saint-Martin-de-Laye
Saint-Martin-du-Bois
Saint-Médard-de-Guizières
Saint-Sauveur-de-Puynormand
Saint-Seurin-sur-l'Isle
Savignac-de-l'Isle
Tayac
Tizac-de-Lapouyade

References

Cantons of Gironde